Álvaro Fortuny López (born June 17, 1979]) is an Olympic breaststroke swimmer from Guatemala. He swam at the 2000 and 2004 Olympics; and was entered in the 2008 Games, but did not compete.

He attended college and swam at the USA's George Washington University.

References

1979 births
Living people
Guatemalan male swimmers
Swimmers at the 1999 Pan American Games
Swimmers at the 2003 Pan American Games
Pan American Games competitors for Guatemala
Swimmers at the 2000 Summer Olympics
Swimmers at the 2004 Summer Olympics
Olympic swimmers of Guatemala
George Washington University alumni